Amour (French: "Love") is a 2012 French-language romantic drama film written and directed by the Austrian filmmaker Michael Haneke, starring Jean-Louis Trintignant, Emmanuelle Riva and Isabelle Huppert. The narrative focuses on an elderly couple, Anne and Georges, who are retired music teachers with a daughter who lives abroad. Anne has a stroke that paralyses the right side of her body. The film is a co-production among the French, German, and Austrian companies Les Films du Losange, X-Filme Creative Pool, and Wega Film.

Amour was screened at the 2012 Cannes Film Festival, where it won the Palme d'Or. It won the Academy Award for Best Foreign Language Film at the 85th Academy Awards and was nominated in four other categories: Best Picture, Best Actress in a Leading Role (Emmanuelle Riva), Best Original Screenplay (Michael Haneke) and Best Director (Michael Haneke). At 85, Riva is the oldest nominee for Best Actress in a Leading Role.

At the 25th European Film Awards, Amour was nominated in six categories, winning in four, including Best Film and Best Director. At the 47th National Society of Film Critics Awards it won Best Film, Best Director and Best Actress. At the 66th British Academy Film Awards it was nominated in four categories, winning for Best Leading Actress and Best Film Not in the English Language. Riva became the oldest person to win a BAFTA. At the 38th César Awards it was nominated in ten categories, winning in five, including Best Film, Best Director, Best Actor and Best Actress. In 2016 the film was named the 42nd best film of the 21st century in a poll of 177 film critics from around the world. The film was 69th on BBC's 2018 list of the 100 greatest foreign-language films as voted by 209 film critics from 43 countries.

Plot
After residents of a Paris apartment building complain of a smell coming from one of the apartments, a brigade of firemen and police break down its door to find the corpse of Anne (Emmanuelle Riva) lying on a bed, adorned with cut flowers.

Several months before the opening scene, Anne and her husband Georges (Jean-Louis Trintignant), both retired piano teachers in their eighties, attend a performance by one of Anne's former pupils, Alexandre. They return home to find that someone has unsuccessfully tried to break into their apartment. The next morning, while they are eating breakfast, Anne silently has a stroke. She sits in a catatonic state, not responding to Georges. She comes around as Georges is about to get help, but has no idea the stroke occurred. Georges is unable to persuade her to get medical attention until Anne finds she is unable to pour herself a drink.

Anne undergoes surgery on a blocked carotid artery, but the surgery goes wrong, leaving her paralyzed on her right side and reliant on a wheelchair. She makes Georges promise not to send her back to the hospital or to a nursing home. Georges becomes Anne's dutiful, though slightly irritated, caretaker. One day, Anne, seemingly having attempted to commit suicide by falling from a window, tells Georges she doesn't want to go on living.

Alexandre, her former pupil whose performance they attended, stops by and Anne gets dressed up and carries on a lively conversation during the visit, giving Georges hope that her condition was temporary. But she soon has a second stroke that leaves her demented and incapable of coherent speech. Georges continues to look after Anne, despite the strain it puts on him.

Georges begins employing a nurse three days a week. Their daughter, Eva (Isabelle Huppert), wants her mother to go into care, but Georges says he will not break the promise he made to Anne. He employs a second nurse, but fires her after he discovers she is mistreating Anne.

One day, Georges sits next to Anne's bedside and tells her a story of his childhood, which calms her. As Anne closes her eyes, he quietly picks up a pillow and smothers her.

Georges returns home with bundles of flowers in his hands, which he proceeds to wash and cut. He picks out a dress from Anne's wardrobe and writes a long letter. He tapes the bedroom door shut and catches a pigeon that has flown in through the window. In the letter, Georges explains that he has released the pigeon. Georges imagines that Anne is washing dishes in the kitchen and, speechless, he gazes at her as she cleans up and prepares to leave the house. Anne calls for Georges to bring a coat, and he complies, following her out of the door.

The film concludes with a continuation of the opening scene, with Eva seated in the living room after wandering around the now-empty home.

Cast
Jean-Louis Trintignant as Georges Laurent
Emmanuelle Riva as Anne Laurent
Isabelle Huppert as Eva Laurent
Alexandre Tharaud as Alexandre
Rita Blanco as Concierge
Carole Franck as Nurse
Dinara Droukarova as Nurse
William Shimell as Geoff
Ramón Agirre as Concierge's husband
Laurent Capelluto as Police officer
Jean-Michel Monroc as Police officer
Suzanne Schmidt as Neighbor
Walid Afkir as Paramedic
Damien Jouillerot as Paramedic

Production
The film was produced for €7,290,000 through France's Les Films du Losange, Germany's X-Filme Creative Pool and Austria's Wega Film. It received co-production support from France 3 and €404,000 in support from the Île-de-France region. Further funding was granted by the Medienboard Berlin-Brandenburg in Germany and National Center of Cinematography and the moving image in France. Principal photography took place from 7 February to 1 April 2011.

After 14 years, Jean-Louis Trintignant came back on screen for Haneke. Haneke had sent Trintignant the script, which had been written specifically for him. Trintignant said that he chooses which films he works in on the basis of the director, and said of Haneke that "he has the most complete mastery of the cinematic discipline, from technical aspects like sound and photography to the way he handles actors".

The film is based on a situation that happened in Haneke's family. The issue that interested him the most was how to manage the suffering of someone you love.

Haneke called the collaboration with Jean-Louis Trintignant and the subject of the film the motivation to make the film. The starting point for Haneke's reflections was the suicide of his 90-year-old aunt, who had raised him. According to Haneke, she had heavy rheumatism and lived her last years alone in her apartment because she did not want to be placed in a nursing home. She had even asked Haneke for euthanasia. According to Haneke, the main theme of his script is not old age and death, but "the question of how to deal with the suffering of a loved one".

Haneke dealt with the matter since 1992. The work on the script was interrupted by a writer's block. Haneke normally wrote out the script exactly before the writing process. This time the end of the story was not clear to him. He began writing in the hope that this would occur to him at work, but this did not happen. "I have tormented myself terribly with the script and I was left with the impression that I have not succeeded in getting the hang of this topic", he said. At the same time the director realized that the Swiss-Canadian Léa Pool with La dernière fugue (2010) had created a similar story, about an old man who is taken care of by his wife. Therefore, he left the project in favor of another. He worked only sporadically on it, until his writer's block loosened and he could finish the script quickly. Haneke wrote it specifically for Trintignant, having already written the scripts for The Piano Teacher (2001) and Caché (2005) specifically for Isabelle Huppert and Daniel Auteuil. Haneke prefers this way of working, because in this way one "writes specifically something that fits to the advantages of each actor and helps to particularly work them out".

Release
Artificial Eye acquired the distribution rights for the United Kingdom and by Sony Pictures Classics in the United States. It has been released on DVD, Blu-ray, and Digital mediums.

Reception
Amour met with widespread acclaim from critics. Review aggregation website Rotten Tomatoes gives the film a score of 93% based on 223 reviews, with an average rating of 8.7/10. The website's critical consensus reads: "With towering performances and an unflinching script from Michael Haneke, Amour represents an honest, heartwrenching depiction of deep love and responsibility." Metacritic gives the film a weighted average rating of 94 out of 100, based on reviews from 44 critics, indicating "universal acclaim."

Writing for The Guardian after the Cannes screening, Peter Bradshaw said "this is film-making at the highest pitch of intelligence and insight", naming it the best film of 2012. Jamie Graham of Total Film gave Amour 5 stars out of 5, stating "far from being a cold, scientific study from a filmmaker frequently accused of placing a pane of glass between his work and his viewers, this sensitive film emerges heartfelt and humane." Dave Calhoun of Time Out London also gave the film 5 out of 5 stars, stating "Amour is devastatingly original and unflinching in the way it examines the effect of love on death, and vice versa". Calling Amour the best film of 2012, critic A. O. Scott of The New York Times said that "months after its debut at Cannes this film already feels permanent." Writing in The Times, critic Manohla Dargis hailed the film as "a masterpiece about life, death and everything in between." The newspaper flagged the film as a critics' pick. The Wall Street Journal film critic Joe Morgenstern wrote of Amour: "Mr. Haneke's film, exquisitely photographed by Darius Khondji, has won all sorts of prizes all over the world, and no wonder; the performances alone set it off as a welcoming masterpiece." Roger Ebert of the Chicago Sun-Times gave the film four stars out of four.

Among the few negative reviews, Calum Marsh of the Slant Magazine gave the film 2 out of 4 stars and indicated that the film "isn't the work of a newly moral or humanistic filmmaker, but another ruse by the same unscrupulous showman whose funny games have been beguiling us for years", adding that "Haneke's gaze, trained from an unbridgeable remove, carries no inflection of empathy; his style is too frigid, his investment too remote, for the world of these characters to open up before us, for their pain to ever feel like something more than functional."

Box office
The film earned a total of $6,739,492 in the United States. In total, it grossed $29,664,140 worldwide  against its $8.9 million budget.

Accolades

Best of 2012
Both Sight & Sound film magazine and Peter Bradshaw of The Guardian named Amour the third-best film of 2012.

See also
Isabelle Huppert on screen and stage
List of submissions to the 85th Academy Awards for Best Foreign Language Film
List of Austrian submissions for the Academy Award for Best Foreign Language Film

References

External links

2012 films
2012 romantic drama films
2010s French-language films
Austrian romantic drama films
BAFTA winners (films)
Best Film César Award winners
Best Foreign Language Film Academy Award winners
Best Foreign Language Film BAFTA Award winners
Best Foreign Language Film Golden Globe winners
European Film Awards winners (films)
French romantic drama films
German romantic drama films
Films about old age
Films directed by Michael Haneke
Films featuring a Best Actor Lumières Award-winning performance
Films featuring a Best Actress César Award-winning performance
Films featuring a Best Actress Lumières Award-winning performance
Films produced by Margaret Ménégoz
Films set in apartment buildings
Films set in Paris
Films shot in France
Films whose director won the Best Director César Award
Best Film Lumières Award winners
Best Foreign Film Guldbagge Award winners
Independent Spirit Award for Best Foreign Film winners
National Society of Film Critics Award for Best Film winners
Palme d'Or winners
Sony Pictures Classics films
Uxoricide in fiction
Warner Bros. films
2010s French films
2010s German films
Films about disability